The East Melbourne Hebrew Congregation, also known as East Melbourne Shule, East Melbourne Synagogue, Melbourne City Synagogue or City of Melbourne Synagogue is a historically significant Jewish congregation in East Melbourne, Victoria, Australia. The synagogue, consecrated in 1877, is the oldest in Melbourne.

History

The congregation was formed in 1857 under the leadership of Reverend Moses Rintel following his leave from the Melbourne Hebrew Congregation.  Initially named Mikveh Israel Melbourne Synagogue, it was provided with a government land grant in 1859 on the corner of Little Lonsdale Street and Stephen Street (today Exhibition Street) in Melbourne's City Centre. A small synagogue was erected on the site in 1860. The congregation consisted primarily of Rintel's followers, including German and Eastern-European Jews who lived in Melbourne's inner-city suburbs within walking distance of the synagogue.

Seeking new premises, the congregation received government permission to sell its property in 1870. It moved to a new site on Albert Street, East Melbourne, where a new synagogue building was consecrated in 1877. Rintel served the congregation until his death in 1880.

Notable members of the congregation included Sir Isaac Isaacs and Sir John Monash. Monash celebrated his Bar Mitzvah at the synagogue and also sang in its choir.

In March 1977 the synagogue's centenary was celebrated with a special service led by Rabbi M. Honig.

Architecture
Continuously in use since 1877, the East Melbourne Synagogue is the oldest in Melbourne and the largest 19th-century synagogue in Victoria. It is listed on the Victorian Heritage Register and is classified by the National Trust of Australia due to its historical, social, and architectural significance.

The two-storeyed synagogue was designed by noted Melbourne architects Crouch & Wilson. The internal space is surrounded on three sides by a gallery carried by cast iron columns, each surmounted by an unusual arrangement of an impost block flanked by consoles. The main ceiling is paneled, with a row of large and unusual ventilators marking the location of former suspended gas lights. The original interior, particularly the bimah and Torah ark, remain in an intact state.

The building's facade, constructed in the style of Renaissance Revival, was completed in 1883. It comprises five bays. Tuscan pilasters divide the bays of the lower floor, and Corinthian pilasters divide the upper floor bays. Two dome-like mansard roofs flank the central pediment.

Today

Led by Rabbi Dovid Gutnick since November 2007, the congregation has a current membership of around 200 families. It is currently the only synagogue in Melbourne's inner-city area.
 
In January 2012, the congregation celebrated its 155th anniversary with a double Torah dedication ceremony and fundraising gala dinner attended by Rabbi Lord Jonathan Sacks (later Baron Sacks), Chief Rabbi of the United Kingdom and the Commonwealth.

See also

 History of the Jews in Australia
 List of synagogues in Australia and New Zealand
 Oldest synagogues in the world

References

Further reading
 Morris C. Davis, History of the East Melbourne Hebrew Congregation "Mickva Yisrael", 1857–1977, East Melbourne Hebrew Congregation, 1977 , 978-0-9596899-0-7
 Maurice Brodzky. Dattner Jacobson and Moses Rintel, Historical Sketch of the Two Melbourne Synagogues Together with Sermons Preached, 1877, Kessinger Publishing LLC, 2009

External links

 
 East Melbourne Synagogue, Victorian Heritage Register
 East Melbourne Synagogue, National Trust

German-Australian culture
Synagogues in Melbourne
Synagogues completed in 1877
East Melbourne, Victoria
Synagogue buildings with domes
Religious organizations established in 1857
Synagogues completed in 1860
Renaissance Revival synagogues
Orthodox synagogues in Australia
1857 establishments in Australia
Heritage-listed buildings in Melbourne
Buildings and structures in the City of Melbourne (LGA)